Álvaro Longoria (born 1968 in Santander, Cantabria, Spain) is a film director, executive producer, and actor.  He produces indie films for several distributors including Cinema Libre and Morena Films. He is perhaps best known for producing the film Everybody Knows directed by Asghar Farhadi and Che starring Benicio Del Toro and directed by Steven Soderbergh as well as Looking for Fidel directed by Oliver Stone. He won a Goya Award for Best Documentary Film for Hijos de las Nubes, a story about the decolonization of the Sahara region of western Africa, starring Javier Bardem. He received the Cinema for Peace International Green Film Award in 2020 for his film Sanctuary, and the Award for Justice in 2019.

Filmography

Film

Documentary

Producer only

Making-offs

Television

References

1968 births
Living people
Spanish film directors
Spanish film producers
People from Santander, Spain